Volta Region (or Volta) is one of Ghana's sixteen administrative regions, with Ho designated as its capital. It is located west of Republic of Togo and to the east of Lake Volta. Divided into 25 administrative districts, the region is multi-ethnic  and multilingual, including groups such as the Ewe, the Guan, and the Akan peoples. The Guan peoples include the Lolobi, Likpe, Akpafu, Buem, and Nkonya (now part of Oti region) people. This region was carved out of the Volta Region in December 2018 by the New Patriotic Party.

Background

The Volta region was formed by the state union of the former British Togoland which was part of the German protectorate of Togoland. It was administered as part of the Gold Coast by the British and later renamed Trans-Volta Togoland.

Demographics
The native and largest ethnic group of the Volta Region (Togoland / British Togoland) are the Ewe people (68.5% of the population). They consist of several sub groups such as the Anlo Ewe, Tongu Ewe, Wedome Ewe, Ave Ewe and Avenor Ewe. Other ethnicities include the Guan people (forming 9.2% of the population), the Akan people (8.5%), and the Gurma people (6.5% of the population).

Administration
The Volta region is run by a Regional Coordinating Council (RCC) and a District Assembly. The RCC is made up of the Volta Regional Minister who is the political head and his deputy as well as representatives of the Regional House of Chiefs, the District Chief Executives of the Volta region, the Presiding Members of the 12 Districts Assemblies and representatives of the various decentralized Ministries, Departments and Agencies in the Volta region. Each district is run by a District Assembly.

Regional Commissioners and Ministers

The current Regional Minister, Archibald Letsa was appointed in February 2017.

Administrative divisions
Before the regional demarcation in December 2018, the region had 25 MMDA's (made up of 0 Metropolitan, 5 Municipal and 20 Ordinary Assemblies) with all the administrative changes as of December 2012. After the census, the Oti Region was carved out of it, reducing the size of the region and the number of administrative districts to 18.

The political administration of the region is through the local government system. Under this administration system, the region is divided into 18 MMDA's (made up of 0 Metropolitan, 6 Municipal and 12 Ordinary Assemblies). Each District, Municipal or Metropolitan Assembly, is administered by a Chief Executive, representing the central government but deriving authority from an Assembly headed by a presiding member elected from among the members themselves. The current list is as follows:

The following districts are now within the boundaries of the Oti Region which was formally created on 15 February 2019.

Constituencies
There are 18 constituencies in the region after the Oti Region was carved out of it.
Previously Volta Region had 19 constituencies in the election in December 2000 and 24 constituencies in December 2004 parliamentary election. Four new constituencies were created by the Electoral Commission prior to the December 2012 parliamentary election, increasing the number of constituencies to 26.

Education

Universities
 Ghana Telecom University College (Now Ghana Communication Technology University)	
 University of Health and Allied Sciences	
 Evangelical Presbyterian University College	
 Ho Technical University
Princefield University College

Nurses' Training and Colleges of Education  

 Ho Nurses' Training College
 Keta Nursing and Midwifery Training College
 Hohoe Midwifery Training College
 Akatsi College of Education
 Peki College of Education
 Holy Spirit College of Education
 St. Francis College of Education
 St. Theresa’s College of Education

Senior High Schools 
St. Paul's Senior High School (SPACO)
Some Senior High School (SOSEC)
Klikor Senior High Technical School (KLISTECH)
Bishop Herman College (BIHECO)
 Kpando Senior High School	
Keta Senior High Technical School
 OLA Girls Senior High School (Ho)
 Mawuko Girls' Senior High School
 Mafi Kumase Senior High Technical School
 Adidome Senior High School
 Sogakofe Senior High School
 Keta Business College 
 Wallahs Academy SHS (Ho)
 Adaklu Senior High School, (Adaklu Waya)
 Awudome Senior High School (AWUSCO), Tsito-Awudome
 Ave Senior High School, Ave Dakpa
Ziope Senior High School
Mawuli Senior High School
 St Prosper's College (HO)
Ideal College
Social Welfare Vocational Training Centre (SWEVCO), HO
Sonrise Christian High School
Abor Senior High School
Zion College
Tanyigbe Senior High School
Three Town Senior High School
Hohoe E.P Senior High School (HEPSS)
 Vakpo Secondary School
Vakpo Secondary Senior High Technical 
Kpedze Senior High School
Peki Senior High School
Shia Senior High School
Peki Senior High Technical School (Pestech)
Kpeve Senior High Technical School
Have Technical Institute
Anfoega Senior High School
Taviefe Senior High School
Agate Senior High School
Atiavi Senior High Technical School(Atiavi)
Alavanyo Senior High Technical School
E.P. Tech/Voc. Institute (Alavanyo)
Kpando Technical Institute
Leklebi Senior High School
Ve Community Senior High School (Ve Koloenu)
Tsito Senior High Technical School
Abutia Senior High Technical School
Sokode Senior High Technical School
St. Catherine Girls Senior High School
Wovenu Senior High Technical School, Tadzewu
Akatsi Senior High Technical School

Health

The Volta Regional Hospital  is located at Ho. It is popularly referred to as Trafalgar. The inception of the University of Health and Allied Sciences (UHAS) at Ho has led to it being redesignated as the Ho Teaching Hospital in 2019. Other government run health facilities in the capital are the Ho Municipal Hospital and the Ho Polyclinic. Hospitals in the region include:

Togoland Congress

The Togoland Congress (TCP) was a political party formed in 1951 to campaign for the unification of the Ewe people in British Togoland and French Togoland as a separate Ewe state. The party was defeated in the May 1956 UN plebiscite in British Togoland, which resulted in the unification of British Trans-Volta Togoland with Gold Coast, which later became independent as Ghana.

On 9 May 1956,  a vote was conducted to decide the future disposition of British Togoland and French Togoland. The native and dominant ethnic group, the Ewe people, were divided between the two Togos. British Togoland inhabitants voted in favor of state union with the Gold Coast, and the Togo Ewe state was incorporated with Gold Coast.

There was vocal opposition to the incorporation of Togoland into modern Ghana, from the Ewe people who voted (42%) against in British Togoland, as the Ewe wanted the unification of the Ewe people in British Togoland and French Togoland as a separate Ewe state (modern Togo).

Recently, a campaign for the cessation of some part of the Volta Region from Ghana to be known as "Western Togoland" is being led by a group calling itself Homeland Study Group Foundation. The group is led by Charles Kormi Kudzodzi.

Tourism

Recreation areas
Museum
 Volta Regional Museum

Mountains
 Mount Afadja
 Mount Adaklu
 Mount Gemi

Other Tourist Attractions
Waterfalls 
 Tafi Agome Caves
Tafi Atome Monkey Sanctuary
 Wli Waterfalls
 Tagbo Falls
 Amedzofe Falls
 Biakpa Falls and Caves
 Kpoeta waterfalls (at Ho West District)
Mount Afadja
 Mount Gemi
 Akpom Falls and limestone cave Logba Tota
 Snake Village Liate Wote
 Adidime waterfalls Klefe (at Ho Municipal)

Notable native citizens

References

External links
 Official website
 Tourism – Volta Region
 Volta Region from statoids.com
 Volta Region – Districts

 
Regions of Ghana
Articles containing video clips
French-speaking countries and territories